Chlewnica  (German Karlshöhe) is a village in the administrative district of Gmina Potęgowo, within Słupsk County, Pomeranian Voivodeship, in northern Poland.

The village has a population of 30.

References

Chlewnica